American Icon may refer to:
 American Icon: Alan Mulally and the Fight to Save Ford Motor Company, a 2012 book by Bryce G. Hoffman
 American Icon: The Fall of Roger Clemens and the Rise of Steroids in America's Pastime, a 2009 book by Teri Thompson, Nathaniel Vinton, Michael O'Keeffe, and Christian Red